Richard Sears defeated William Glyn in the final, 6–0, 6–3, 6–2 to win the inaugural men's singles tennis title at the 1881 U.S. National Championships. Except for the final, each match was played on the best of three sets. Winner of a set was the player who won six games first; no two-games advantage was required. The participation was restricted to USNLTA club members only.

Draw

Finals

Top half

Bottom half

References 

 

1881
Men's Singles